Lysine demethylase 3A is a protein that in humans is encoded by the KDM3A gene.

Function 

This gene encodes a zinc finger protein that contains a jumonji C (JmjC) domain and may play a role in hormone-dependent transcriptional activation. Alternative splicing results in multiple transcript variants. KDM3A catalyzes the demethylation of H3K9me1 and H3K9me2 residues. Its function is dependent on the presence of cofactors Fe(II) and α-Ketoglutarate.

References

Further reading 

 

Human proteins